On October 13, 1840, the same day as the general elections for the 27th Congress, a special election was held in  to fill a vacancy caused by the resignation of Richard Biddle (AM).

Election results

Brackenridge took office on December 10, 1840.

See also
List of special elections to the United States House of Representatives

References

Pennsylvania 1840 22
Pennsylvania 1840 22
1840 22
Pennsylvania 22
United States House of Representatives 22
United States House of Representatives 1840 22